Beverley Dunn is an Australian set decorator.

Dunn has served as set decorator in a number of films. Dunn, along with production designer Catherine Martin, won an Academy Award for Best Production Design for the 2013 film The Great Gatsby.
Dunn grew up and resides in Sydney. She was educated at Cheltenham Girls High School and University of Western Sydney.

References

External links

Living people
Best Art Direction Academy Award winners
Best Production Design BAFTA Award winners
Set decorators
Year of birth missing (living people)
Place of birth missing (living people)
Best Production Design AACTA Award winners